Hemichromis is a genus of fishes from the cichlid family, known in the aquarium trade as jewel cichlids. Jewel cichlids are native to Africa. Within West Africa, Hemichromis species are found in creeks, streams, rivers and lakes with a variety of water qualities including brackish water lagoons.

Maximum sizes in aquaria tend to be slightly smaller than in the wild.

Many Hemichromis species are brightly coloured, though brighter body colouration is generally evident during breeding. Sexual dimorphism is limited, though male jewel cichlids are typically more brightly coloured and in some species have more pointed anal, ventral and dorsal fins. In some species, such as Hemichromis cristatus, the females can have coloring as bright as the males. Like most cichlids, jewel cichlids have highly developed brood care. Hemichromis species typically form monogamous breeding pairs and the female spawns on a flat surface such as a leaf or stone. Both parents guard the eggs, and participate in fry raising.

Taxonomy

This genus consists of two distinct groups that possibly should be moved into separate genera. The first group, the so-called five-spotted cichlids (including H. elongatus, H. faciatus and H. frempongi), would remain in the genus Hemichromis, while the rest, the true jewel cichlids, would be moved to their own genus.

The species level taxonomy of this genus is not fully resolved. Although some of the localized species are well-defined, this is not the case for all the more widespread species and there are several distinct color forms of unclear taxonomic status. For example, H. faciatus of the Nile basin and those in West Africa may belong to separate species, but H. frempongi of Lake Bosumtwi might be a synonym of H. fasciatus. H. elongatus of the Congo River basin and upper Zambezi may represent a species that is distinct from H. faciatus elsewhere, and "dwarf" populations in lakes  Barombi Koto and Mboandong may also be distinct. In the Nile delta, there appear to be two morphologically distinct populations that traditionally have been included in, but might be separate from, H. letourneuxi elsewhere in the Nile system. A comprehensive study of the genus also points to the existence of two undescribed species of jewel cichlids in the Guinea region. H. saharae was generally considered a synonym of H. letourneuxi until 2014 where a genetic study confirmed its distinction, although some have opted to retain the two as a single species. The taxonomic confusion in this genus has been further complicated by fish in the aquarium trade, where there have been frequent misidentification, hybridization between species and selective breeding. For example, the introduced population in Florida, which is based on aquarium fish, was identified as H. bimaculatus up until the 1990s, but likely are H. letourneuxi  or hybrids. A similar pattern can be seen in introduced populations elsewhere that traditionally were identified as H. bimaculatus, but likely are other species, especially H. letourneuxi.

Species
There are currently 13 recognized species in this genus:

 Hemichromis angolensis Steindachner, 1865
 Hemichromis bimaculatus T. N. Gill, 1862 (Jewelfish)
Hemichromis camerounensis 
Hemichromis cerasogaster (Boulenger, 1899)
 Hemichromis elongatus (Guichenot, 1861) (Banded jewel cichlid)
 Hemichromis exsul (Trewavas, 1933) (Turkana jewel cichlid)
 Hemichromis fasciatus W. K. H. Peters, 1857 (Banded jewelfish, five-spot cichlid)
 Hemichromis frempongi Loiselle, 1979
 Hemichromis guttatus Günther, 1862
 Hemichromis letourneuxi Sauvage, 1880
 Hemichromis lifalili Loiselle, 1979
 Hemichromis saharae Sauvage, 1880
 Hemichromis stellifer Loiselle, 1979

Aquarium care
Jewel cichlids are neither suited to beginners, nor the usual community tank. Several young specimens may be kept in a spacious aquarium, with stones and wood for cover until a pair forms prior to breeding. Their innate aggression makes them good candidates for keeping in a monospecies aquarium, however this depends on a number of factors similar to all tropical cichlid fish; swimming and territory space, other aquatic inhabitants, diet and feeding frequency and tank layout.

Jewel cichlids are omnivorous and will eat both live foods and fish flakes.

See also
List of freshwater aquarium fish species

References 

Hemichromini
Hemichromis
Fishkeeping
Taxa named by Wilhelm Peters

ru:Хемихромис-красавец